Rochester High School is a public high school located in Rochester Hills, Michigan, United States, and is part of the Rochester Community Schools. It was established in 1883, and classes have been held in the current facility since 1955.

The school mascot is Freddie the Falcon. Most students attending this school come from Reuther Middle School, West Middle School, or Holy Family Regional School.

History

In 1889, Rochester's first high school, known as the "Academy on the Hill", was built on Fourth and Wilcox in the (then) Village of Rochester for $8,000. The first class graduated from Rochester High School in 1896. The historic structure still exists, long since adapted and widely renovated for Board of Education offices and a variety of other uses.

Rochester High accreditation was granted in 1924.

In 1955, groundbreaking for a new building at the current location on the corner of Livernois and Walton in Rochester Hills took place and on October 31, 1956, students walked from the "Academy on the Hill" to the new Rochester High School, many carrying their books along with them.
The gymnasium was added in 1957.
The two-story wing (freshman hallway) was built in 1961.
The auditorium, the bridge (a.k.a. Falcon Freeway), and the swimming pool were added in 1965.
The school split to a half-day schedule to accommodate the growing student population while Rochester Adams High School was being built and completed in 1970.
In 1986, the mall enclosure, media center, cafeteria, and auxiliary gym were added.
In 1998, a courtyard was converted into four classrooms.
In 1999, the metal shop was converted into two classrooms.

A complete renovation of Rochester High took place in 2001, which included upgrades to the main office, counseling offices,   weight room, pool, gymnasium, the addition of computer labs and photography lab, theater and vocal area, additional science labs, new locker banks, an enhanced courtyard with green house, and a new auditorium and theater areas.

In 2012, the school organized a series of murals and artwork displays within the building's hallways to showcase student accomplishments and school spirit.

The school began a new round of renovations in the fall of 2016 after the renewing of the funding bond. Renovations included a new football and soccer stadium and updates to the athletic wing and theater.

Notable alumni
 Porcelain Black, née Alaina Beaton, pop singer
 Jim Burton, former MLB player (Boston Red Sox)
 Paul Davis, former NBA player (Los Angeles Clippers)
 Andrew Good, Major League Baseball pitcher
 Robert Hurst, jazz bassist
 Andrew Hutchinson, National Hockey League defenseman
 Brad Keselowski, NASCAR stock car driver
 Gary Peters, United States Senator from Michigan
 Walker Russell, Jr., NBA player for the Detroit Pistons
 L. J. Shelton, National Football League offensive tackle
 James Young, NBA player; 2019-20 top scorer in the Israel Basketball Premier League

References
http://www.rochester.k12.mi.us/index.aspx?item=144&name=About%20Us&school=25

External links
 

Public high schools in Michigan
Educational institutions established in 1955
High schools in Oakland County, Michigan
1955 establishments in Michigan
Schools in Rochester Hills, Michigan